Desert Car Kings is a reality television series that debuted on the Discovery Channel on January 26, 2011. It is based on the McClure family, who run Desert Valley Auto Parts in Phoenix, Arizona. The show's main characters, Jason and his father Ron, restore classic cars on a limited time-frame; restorations are usually given until their next auction. The operation houses more than 10,000 rust-free vehicles on more than 100 acres of dry Arizona land. Restorations have included a 1965 Ford Thunderbird, a 1970 Oldsmobile 442, a 1962 Ford Galaxie, a 1964 Plymouth Barracuda, a 1955 Ford F-100, and a 1966 Chevrolet Chevelle SS. With average ratings, critics vary in their opinion on the show. Some praise it, others calling it superficial. With its time slot competing with cable television's highest-rated reality show at the time (A&E's, Storage Wars), the show had several factors working against it. Despite the final episode airing over a year earlier, according to a May 6, 2012 Discovery Channel Facebook posting, the show had not been canceled. Finally, an announcement came from Discovery Channel that a second season of Desert Valley Car Kings was not picked up due to production costs. Since its cancellation, it has begun airing reruns on the Velocity cable television network. As of July 2015, it is also airing in the UK on the Quest station (Recorded in 2011 - Some confusion, UK viewers think it is more recent). It is now showing on Pluto TV.

External links
http://dsc.discovery.com/tv/desert-car-kings/ April 4, 2011
http://dsc.discovery.com/tv/desert-car-kings/episodes.html April 4, 2011 Episode List
http://blogs.phoenixnewtimes.com/jackalope/2011/01/desert_car_kings_debuts_tonigh.php

2011 American television series debuts
2011 American television series endings
2010s American reality television series
Automotive television series
Discovery Channel original programming